Winooski was a hamlet in the Town of Lyndon in Sheboygan County, Wisconsin, United States, at 43° 42.423′ N, 87° 59.039′ W. It was named after Winooski, Vermont, home of James and Lucinda Stone, who were the town's first settlers in 1846.

History
Winooski as of 1875 had its own post office and village hall. Businesses included saw and grist mills, a cheese factory, and a general store, as well as a cooper, a blacksmith, and a woodworking shop. There were perhaps a dozen houses in the settlement proper.

Notable people
Otto B. Joerns, Wisconsin State Assemblyman, mayor of Sheboygan, Wisconsin, and businessman, was born in Winooski.
Abolitionist hero Capt. Jonathan K. Walker, "The Man With The Branded Hand," lived in Winooski.

References 

1846 establishments in Wisconsin Territory
Geography of Sheboygan County, Wisconsin
Ghost towns in Wisconsin
Populated places established in 1846